Executive Order 13942 is the 178th executive order signed by former U.S. President Donald Trump on August 6, 2020, which directs the Secretary of Commerce to prohibit all transactions between anyone under the jurisdiction the United States and ByteDance, the parent company of social media platform TikTok.

Background

Provisions 
Prohibits all transactions between ByteDance and anyone under the jurisdiction of the United States
Empowers the United States Secretary of Commerce to enforce this rule, using the powers granted by IEEPA

References

Executive orders of Donald Trump